Quzeyxırman (also, Ghouze-Kaler, Guze-Kaler, Gyuzeykaler, and Quzeyqaler) is a village in the Khojavend District of Azerbaijan.

References 

Populated places in Khojavend District